Méry-ès-Bois is a commune in the Cher department in the Centre-Val de Loire region of France.

Geography
Two rivers have their source here, the Mocquart and the Guette and the Barangeon river flows through the middle of the commune.

Population

Sights
 The church of St. Firmin, dating from the eleventh century.
 The thirteenth-century abbey of Loroy.

See also
Communes of the Cher department

References

Communes of Cher (department)